Santa Fe is an unincorporated community in Stephens County, Oklahoma, United States. The elevation is 1,099 feet.

References

Unincorporated communities in Stephens County, Oklahoma
Unincorporated communities in Oklahoma